Benjamin Cooper (1854 – January 1920) was a British politician and trade unionist.

Cooper was born and grew up in Norwich, where he completed an apprenticeship in cigar-making.  He subsequently moved to London, where he became active in the Cigar Makers' Mutual Association.

Cooper was soon elected as general secretary of his union.  A supporter of the New Unionism, around the start of the 1890s, he helped found unions for workers in bass-dressing, match-making, dock work, confectionery and stick manufacture, as well as a separate union for female cigar makers. At the 1892 London County Council election, he was elected as a Labour and Progressive Party candidate in Bow and Bromley.

Cooper's newfound prominence led to his election to the Parliamentary Committee of the Trades Union Congress, and he held his seat on the council for many years. He also served on the council of the General Federation of Trade Unions.

Cooper stood as a Liberal-Labour candidate in the 1907 Stepney by-election, but he was easily defeated by Frederick Leverton Harris.

In 1918, Cooper organised the merger of the Cigar Makers' Mutual Association with other small unions, to form the National Cigar and Tobacco Workers' Union.  He became the first leader of the new union, but retired shortly afterwards, and died in January 1920.

References

1854 births
1920 deaths
British trade union leaders
Liberal-Labour (UK) politicians
Members of London County Council
Members of the Parliamentary Committee of the Trades Union Congress
Politicians from Norwich
Progressive Party (London) politicians